Khulna Government Public Library is a public library in Khulna, Bangladesh.

The library were established in 1897. The collections of the library are over 30,000 volumes.

Directors of the Library 
Dr. Mohd. Ahsan Ullah

Events 
Day essay competition
Competition in the beautiful writing

References 

Libraries in Bangladesh
Public libraries
Libraries established in 1897